Pahlavi is a particular, exclusively written form of various Middle Iranian languages. The essential characteristics of Pahlavi are:
the use of a specific Aramaic-derived script;
the incidence of Aramaic words used as heterograms (called uzwārišn, "archaisms").
Pahlavi compositions have been found for the dialects/ethnolects of Parthia, Persis, Sogdiana, Scythia, and Khotan. Independent of the variant for which the Pahlavi system was used, the written form of that language only qualifies as Pahlavi when it has the characteristics noted above.

Pahlavi is then an admixture of:
written Imperial Aramaic, from which Pahlavi derives its script, logograms, and some of its vocabulary.
spoken Middle Iranian, from which Pahlavi derives its terminations, symbol rules, and most of its vocabulary.

Pahlavi may thus be defined as a system of writing applied to (but not unique for) a specific language group, but with critical features alien to that language group. It has the characteristics of a distinct language, but is not one. It is an exclusively written system, but much Pahlavi literature remains essentially an oral literature committed to writing and so retains many of the characteristics of oral composition.

Etymology
The term Pahlavi is said to be derived from the Old Iranian word Parθava, meaning Parthia, a region just east of the Caspian Sea, with the -i suffix denoting the language and people of that region. If this etymology is correct, Parθava presumably became Pahlav through a semivowel glide rt (or in other cases rd) change to l, a common occurrence in language evolution (e.g. sāl < sard, zāl < zard, gul < vard, sālār < sardar, mīlād < mihrdāt, etc.). The term has also been traced back to Avestan pərəthu- "broad [as the earth]", also evident in Sanskrit pŗthvi- "earth" and parthivi "[lord] of the earth".

History
The earliest attested use of Pahlavi dates to the reign of Arsaces I of Parthia (250 BC) in early Parthian coins with Pahlavi scripts. There are also several Pahlavi texts written during the reign of Mithridates I (r. 171–138 BC). The cellars of the treasury at Mithradatkird (near modern-day Nisa) reveal thousands of pottery sherds with brief records; several ostraca that are fully dated  bear references to members of the immediate family of the king.

Such fragments, as also the rock inscriptions of Sasanian kings, which are datable to the 3rd and 4th centuries AD, do not, however, qualify as a significant literary corpus. Although in theory Pahlavi could have been used to render any Middle Iranian language and hence may have been in use as early as 300 BC, no manuscripts that can be dated to before the 6th century AD have yet been found. Thus, when used for the name of a literary genre, i.e. Pahlavi literature, the term refers to Middle Iranian (mostly Middle Persian) texts dated near or after the fall of the Sassanid Empire and (with exceptions) extending to about AD 900, after which Iranian languages enter the "modern" stage.

The oldest surviving example of the Pahlavi literature is from fragments of the so-called "Pahlavi Psalter", a 6th- or 7th-century-AD translation of a Syriac Psalter found at Bulayïq on the Silk Road, near Turpan in north-west China. It is in a more archaic script than Book Pahlavi.

After the Muslim conquest of Persia, the Pahlavi script was gradually replaced by the Arabic script, except in Zoroastrian sacred literature.

The replacement of the Pahlavi script with the Arabic script in order to write the Persian language was done by the Tahirids in 9th century Khurasan.

Modern times
In the present day, "Pahlavi" is frequently identified with the prestige dialect of south-west Iran, formerly and properly called Pārsi, after Pars (Persia proper). This practice can be dated to the period immediately following the Islamic conquest.

Script
The Pahlavi script is one of the two essential characteristics of the Pahlavi system (see above). Its origin and development occurred independently of the various Middle Iranian languages for which it was used. The Pahlavi script is derived from the Aramaic script as it was used under the Sasanians, with modifications to support the phonology of the Iranian languages. It is essentially a typical abjad, where, in general, only long vowels are marked with matres lectionis (although short /i/ and /u/ are sometimes expressed so as well), and vowel-initial words are marked with an aleph. However, because of the high incidence of logograms derived from Aramaic words, the Pahlavi script is far from always phonetic; and even when it is phonetic, it may have more than one transliterational symbol per sign, because certain originally different Aramaic letters have merged into identical graphic forms – especially in the Book Pahlavi variety. (For a review of the transliteration problems of Pahlavi, see Henning.) In addition to this, during much of its later history, Pahlavi orthography was characterized by historical or archaizing spellings. Most notably, it continued to reflect the pronunciation that preceded the widespread Iranian lenition processes, whereby postvocalic voiceless stops and affricates had become voiced, and voiced stops had become semivowels.

The Pahlavi script consisted of two widely used forms: Inscriptional Pahlavi and Book Pahlavi. A third form, Psalter Pahlavi, is not widely attested.

Inscriptional Parthian

Although the Parthian Arsacids generally wrote in Greek, some of the coins and seals of the Arsacid period (mid-3rd-century BC to early 3rd-century AD) also include inscriptions in the Parthian language. The script of these inscriptions is called inscriptional Parthian. Numerous clay fragments from Arsacid-era Parthia proper, in particular a large collection of fragments from Nisa that date to the reign of Mithridates I (r. 171–138 BC), are likewise inscribed in inscriptional Parthian. The bilingual and trilingual inscriptions of the early (3rd-century AD) Sassanids include Parthian texts, which were then also rendered in inscriptional Parthian. The Parthian language was a Middle Iranian language of Parthia proper, a region in the north-western segment of the Iranian plateau where the Arsacids had their power base.

Inscriptional Parthian script had 22 letters for sounds and 8 letters for numerals. The letters were not joined. Inscriptional Parthian has its own Unicode block.

Inscriptional Pahlavi

Inscriptional Pahlavi is the name given to a variant of the Pahlavi script as used to render the 3rd6th-century Middle Persian language inscriptions of the Sasanian kings and other notables. Genuine Middle Persian as it appears in these inscriptions was the Middle Iranian language of Persia proper, the region in the south-western corner of the Iranian plateau where the Sasanians had their power base.

Inscriptional Pahlavi script had 19 characters which were not joined.

Psalter Pahlavi

Psalter Pahlavi derives its name from the so-called "Pahlavi Psalter", a 6th- or 7th-century translation of a Syriac book of psalms. This text, which was found at Bulayiq near Turpan in northwest China, is the earliest evidence of literary composition in Pahlavi, dating to the 6th or 7th century AD.  The extant manuscript dates no earlier than the mid-6th century since the translation reflects liturgical additions to the Syriac original by Mar Aba I, who was Patriarch of the Church of the East c. 540–552. Its use is peculiar to Christians in Iran, given its use in a fragmentary manuscript of the Psalms of David.

The script of the psalms has altogether 18 graphemes, 5 more than Book Pahlavi and one less than Inscriptional Pahlavi. As in Book Pahlavi, letters are connected to each other. The only other surviving source of Psalter Pahlavi are the inscriptions on a bronze processional cross found at Herat, in present-day Afghanistan. Due to the dearth of comparable material, some words and phrases in both sources remain undeciphered.

Of the 18 characters, 9 connect in all four traditional abjad positions, while 9 connect only on their right or are isolated. Numbers are built from units of 1, 2, 3, 4, 10, 20, and 100. The numbers 10 and 20 join on both sides, but the numbers 1, 2, 3, and 4 only join on the right, and if they are followed by an additional digit, they lose their tail, which is visually evident in their isolated forms. There are 12 encoded punctuation characters, and many are similar to those found in Syriac. The section marks are written in half-red and half-black, and several documents have entire sections in both black and red, as a means of distinction.

Book Pahlavi

Book Pahlavi is a smoother script in which letters are joined to each other and often form complicated ligatures. Book Pahlavi was the most common form of the script, with only 13 graphemes representing 24 sounds. The formal coalescence of originally different letters caused ambiguity, and the letters became even less distinct when they formed part of a ligature. In its later forms, attempts were made to improve the consonantary and reduce ambiguity through diacritic marks.

Book Pahlavi continued to be in common use until about AD 900. After that date, Pahlavi was preserved only by the Zoroastrian clergy.

Logograms

In both Inscriptional and Book Pahlavi, many common words, including even pronouns, particles, numerals, and auxiliaries, were spelled according to their Aramaic equivalents, which were used as logograms. These words were known as uzwārišn. Such a logogram could also be followed by letters expressing parts of the Persian word phonetically, e.g.  for pidar "father". The grammatical endings were usually written phonetically. A logogram did not necessarily originate from the lexical form of the word in Aramaic, it could also come from a declined or conjugated Aramaic form. For example, tō "you" (singular) was spelt  (Aramaic "to you", including the preposition l-). A word could be written phonetically even when a logogram for it existed (pidar could be  or ), but logograms were nevertheless used very frequently in texts.

Many uzwārišn are listed in the lexicon Frahang ī Pahlavīg. The practice of using these logograms appears to have originated from the use of Aramaic in the chancelleries of the Achaemenid Empire. Partly similar phenomena are found in the use of Sumerograms and Akkadograms in ancient Mesopotamia and the Hittite empire, and in the adaptation of Chinese writing to Japanese.

Problems in reading Book Pahlavi
As pointed out above, the convergence in form of many of the characters of Book Pahlavi causes a high degree of ambiguity in most Pahlavi writing and it needs to be resolved by the context. Some mergers are restricted to particular groups of words or individual spellings. Further ambiguity is added by the fact that even outside of ligatures, the boundaries between letters are not clear, and many letters look identical to combinations of other letters. As an example, one may take the fact that the name of God, Ohrmazd, could equally be read (and, by Parsis, often was read) Anhoma. Historically speaking, it was spelt , a fairly straightforward spelling for an abjad. The logograms could also pose problems. For this reason, important religious texts were sometimes transcribed into the phonetically unambiguous Avestan alphabet. This latter system is called Pazand.

Literary dialects
From a formal historical and linguistic point of view, the Pahlavi script does not have a one-to-one correspondence with any Middle Iranian language: none was written in Pahlavi exclusively, and inversely, the Pahlavi script was used for more than one language. Still, the vast majority of surviving Pahlavi texts are in Middle Persian, hence the occasional use of the term "Pahlavi" to refer to that language.

Arsacid Pahlavi 

Following the overthrow of the Seleucids, the Parthian Arsacids—who considered themselves the legitimate heirs of the Achaemenids—adopted the manner, customs and government of the Persian court of two centuries previously. Among the many practices so adopted was the use of the Aramaic language ("Imperial Aramaic") that together with Aramaic script served as the language of the chancellery. By the end of the Arsacid era, the written Aramaic words had come to be understood as logograms, as explained above.

The use of Pahlavi gained popularity following its adoption as the language/script of the commentaries (Zand) on the Avesta. Propagated by the priesthood, who were not only considered to be transmitters of all knowledge but were also instrumental in government, the use of Pahlavi eventually reached all corners of the Parthian Arsacid empire.

Arsacid Pahlavi is also called Parthian Pahlavi (or just Parthian), Chaldeo-Pahlavi, or Northwest Pahlavi, the latter reflecting its apparent development from a dialect that was almost identical to that of the Medes.

Sasanian Pahlavi 

Following the defeat of the Parthian Arsacids by the Persian Sasanians (Sassanids), the latter inherited the empire and its institutions, and with it the use of the Aramaic-derived language and script. Like the Parthians before him, Ardašēr, the founder of the Sasanian empire, projected himself as a successor to the regnal traditions of the first, in particular those of Artaxerxes II, whose throne name the new emperor adopted.

From a linguistic point of view, there was probably only little disruption. Since the Sasanian had inherited the bureaucracy, in the beginning the affairs of government went on as before, with the use of dictionaries such as the Frahang ī Pahlavīg assisting the transition. More importantly, being both Western Middle Iranian languages, Parthian was closely related to the dialect of the southwest (which was more properly called Pārsīg, that is, the language of Pārsā, Persia proper).

Arsacid Pahlavi did not die out with the Arsacids. It is represented in some bilingual inscriptions alongside the Sasanian Pahlavi; by the parchment manuscripts of Auroman; and by certain Manichaean texts from Turpan. Furthermore, the archaic orthography of Sasanian Pahlavi continued to reflect, in many respects, pronunciations that had been used in Arsacid times (in Parthia as well as Fars) and not its contemporary pronunciation.

Sasanian Pahlavi is also called Sassanid Pahlavi, Persian Pahlavi, or Southwest Pahlavi.

It is between 1787 and 1791 that Antoine Isaac Silvestre de Sacy deciphered the Pahlavi inscriptions of the Sassanid kings.

Post-conquest Pahlavi
Following the Islamic conquest of the Sassanids, the term Pahlavi came to refer to the (written) "language" of the southwest (i.e. Pārsi). How this came to pass remains unclear, but it has been assumed that this was simply because it was the dialect that the conquerors would have been most familiar with. 

As the language and script of religious and semi-religious commentaries, Pahlavi remained in use long after that language had been superseded (in general use) by Modern Persian and Arabic script had been adopted as the means to render it. As late as the 17th century, Zoroastrian priests in Iran admonished their Indian co-religionists to learn it.

Post-conquest Pahlavi (or just Pahlavi) is also called Zoroastrian Pahlavi or Zoroastrian Middle Persian.

Unicode

Tables showing the letters and their names or pronunciations are available online.

Inscriptional Pahlavi and Inscriptional Parthian were added to the Unicode Standard in October 2009 with the release of version 5.2. Psalter Pahlavi was added in June 2014 with the release of version 7.0. There have been three main proposals for encoding Book Pahlavi.

The Unicode block for Inscriptional Pahlavi is U+10B60–U+10B7F:

The Unicode block for Inscriptional Parthian is U+10B40–U+10B5F:

The Unicode block for Psalter Pahlavi is U+10B80–U+10BAF:

See also
 Imperial Aramaic
 Middle Iranian languages
 Manichaean alphabet

References

Bibliography

External links

Language and literature
 . Includes extracts from West and Kent.
 : classification of Pahlavi.
  and 2 (partly outdated).
  (partly outdated).
 .

Writing system
 .
 
 
 
 .
 .

Abjad writing systems
Iranian inscriptions
Parthian Empire
Obsolete writing systems
Middle Persian
Persian scripts
Right-to-left writing systems